The 2010 congressional elections in New Hampshire were held on November 2, 2010 to determine who will represent the state of New Hampshire in the United States House of Representatives.  It coincided with the state's senatorial and gubernatorial elections. Representatives are elected for two-year terms; those elected served in the 112th Congress from January 2011 until January 2013.

New Hampshire has two seats in the House, apportioned according to the 2000 United States census. Both seats were held by Democrats in the 111th Congress. As of 2022, this is the last time Republicans have won both U.S. House seats in New Hampshire.

Overview

By district
Results of the 2010 United States House of Representatives elections in New Hampshire by district:

District 1

Democratic incumbent Carol Shea-Porter was defeated by Republican nominee and former Manchester Mayor Frank Guinta on November 2, 2010.

This district covers the southeastern and eastern portions of New Hampshire, consisting of three general areas: Greater Manchester, the Seacoast and the Lakes Region. It includes all of Carroll and Strafford counties, all but three towns of Rockingham County and all but two towns of Belknap County, as well as a small portion of Hillsborough County, and one town in Merrimack County.

Polling

Results

District 2

Democratic candidate Ann McLane Kuster was defeated by Republican nominee and former Congressman Charles Bass on November 2, 2010.

This was an open seat. Candidates running were Democratic nominee Ann McLane Kuster, Republican nominee Charles Bass, Libertarian nominee Howard Wilson, and Independent candidate Tim vanBlommesteyn.

In February 2009, Republican U.S. Senator Judd Gregg was briefly nominated to be President Barack Obama's Secretary of Commerce, but withdrew. Gregg announced after withdrawing his nomination that he would not run for re-election, leaving the seat open. Democratic incumbent Paul Hodes had announced his candidacy for the seat while Gregg had been nominated but had not yet withdrawn.

Concord attorney Ann McLane Kuster and Katrina Swett, faced off in the Democratic primary.  (Two other candidates dropped out before the filing deadline in June 2010: State Representative John DeJoie and former Democratic gubernatorial candidate Mark Fernald.)  Kuster was the eventual victor, 69-31.

On the Republican side, former state Representative Bob Giuda declared his candidacy for the seat. The 2008 Republican nominee for this seat, Jennifer Horn, announced her intentions to run a second time on October 7, 2009. Former six-term Congressman Charles Bass formed an exploratory committee to run for this seat on October 1, 2009 and later formally filed. In the resultant Republican primary, Charlie Bass narrowly defeated Jennifer Horn, with Giuda far behind.

This district consists of the western and northern portions of the state, including all of Cheshire, Coos, Grafton, and Sullivan counties as well as almost all of Merrimack and Hillsborough counties plus three towns in Rockingham County and two towns in Belknap County.

Polling

Results

References

External links
Election Division at the New Hampshire Secretary of State
U.S. Congress Candidates for New Hampshire at Project Vote Smart
New Hampshire U.S. House from OurCampaigns.com
Campaign contributions for U.S. Congressional races in New Hampshire from OpenSecrets
2010 Illinois General Election graph of multiple polls from Pollster.com

House - New Hampshire from the Cook Political Report

New Hampshire
2010
2010 New Hampshire elections